Mahidasht may refer to:
Mahidashti Plains, Region in Kermanshah, Iran
Mahidasht District, an administrative subdivision of Iran
Mahidasht Rural District, an administrative subdivision of Iran
Robat, a city in Iran